This is a list of rides and attractions that previously existed at the Kentucky Kingdom amusement park in Louisville, Kentucky, U.S.

Former roller coasters

Former rides

References

Kentucky Kingdom
Lists of former amusement park attractions